Regina Woodward (born 18 September 1970) is a Hungarian ice dancer. She competed in the ice dance event at the 1992 Winter Olympics.

References

External links
 

1970 births
Living people
Hungarian female ice dancers
Olympic figure skaters of Hungary
Figure skaters at the 1992 Winter Olympics
People from Sunrise, Florida
Sportspeople from Broward County, Florida